Medeli also known as Henchir-Mencoub is a location and archaeology site in Tunisia , North Africa.
Medeli was a Roman era town of the Roman Province of Africa Proconsularis, and lasted through the Roman, Vandal and Byzantine empires.

References

Roman towns and cities in Africa (Roman province)
Catholic titular sees in Africa
Former Roman Catholic dioceses in Africa